Citrix Workspace App (formerly Citrix Receiver) is the client component of XenDesktop and XenApp, developed by Citrix Systems. It was released initially in 2009.

Product overview
Citrix Receiver is the client component of XenDesktop or XenApp. Devices with Receiver installed are able to access full desktops via XenDesktop or individual applications via XenApp from a centralized host, such as a server or cloud infrastructure. The product's intended users are employees.

Citrix Receiver is not a standalone product and is included with XenApp and XenDesktop.

Reviews praised Citrix Receiver's reasonably fast loading time and flexibility in allowing remote desktop access from many different computer and mobile platforms. However, reviewers also criticized the iPhone version of the software for the difficulty of formatting text and prolonged typing, tasks that normally required a keyboard and mouse. The iPad version had similar accessibility issues, and the performance of Flash applications was very limited. As a remedy, Citrix developed a mouse for iOS devices.

Update from the Citrix website:  As of August 2018, Citrix Workspace app has replaced Citrix Receiver.

Citrix Workspace app is a new client from Citrix that works similar to Citrix Receiver and is fully backward-compatible with your organization’s Citrix infrastructure. Citrix Workspace app provides the full capabilities of Citrix Receiver, as well as new capabilities based on your organization’s Citrix deployment.

History
Prior to Receiver, Citrix had a different client for each of its products. The company developed Receiver to handle the management of those clients. Citrix Receiver was announced in 2009 and the first version became available later that year. Citrix Receiver won several mobility awards after its release, including a CRN Appy and "Best of Interop" award for Wireless & Mobility in 2011, and a Global Mobile Award in 2012. As of August 2018, Citrix Workspace app has replaced Citrix Receiver

References

External links

Citrix Systems
Centralized computing
Remote desktop
Business software